Alex Molenaar (born 13 July 1999) is a Dutch racing cyclist, who currently rides for UCI ProTeam . He won the Tour of Romania in 2019. In October 2020, he was named in the startlist for the 2020 Vuelta a España.

Major results
2017
 1st  Overall SPIE Internationale Juniorendriedaagse
 5th Menen–Kemmel–Menen
 8th Overall GP Général Patton
2018
 4th Overall Tour of Szeklerland
1st  Young rider classification
2019
 1st  Overall Tour of Romania
1st  Young rider classification
 1st Stage 8 Tour of Qinghai Lake
 1st Stage 2 Oberösterreichrundfahrt
 1st  Young rider classification, GP Beiras e Serra da Estrela
2020
  Combativity award Stage 10 Vuelta a España
2022
 1st Stage 8 Tour de Langkawi

Grand Tour general classification results timeline

References

External links

1999 births
Living people
Dutch male cyclists
Cyclists from Rotterdam